Dorge Rostand Kouemaha (born 28 June 1983) is a Cameroonian former professional footballer who plays as a forward for Belgian club Sprimont Comblain.

Career
Kouemaha joined Greek side Aris in January 2005 from Victoria United Limbé as actual topscorer of the Cameroonian League. He made his debut for the club in a cup match against Ethnikos Piraeus, scoring the match winner after being brought as a sub in the 59th minute. In August 2005, Kouemaha was transferred to Hungarian side Tatabánya FC. He immediately managed to become a regular scorer for a relatively weak team in the Hungarian league. His 14 league goals for Tatabánya helped him to attract the interest of league leader Debreceni VSC. He finally moved to Debrecen to become their topscorer with 14 league goals in the 2007–08 season.

German 2. Bundesliga outfit MSV Duisburg signed Kouemaha for their 2008–09 campaign. Boosted by his first nomination to the Cameroonian national team, Kouemaha answered the expectations once more by scoring 15 goals in 35 matches. His immediate success in German football led to a €1.2 million move to Belgian club Club Brugge KV for the 2009–10 season. His 16 league goals during that season made him the top goalgetter of the Belgian League. The steady progress in his career broke down with permanent problems with his Achilles tendon in the 2010–11 season which led to a rupture while playing on loan for 1. FC Kaiserslautern in February 2012. Kouemaha celebrated his comeback in the Bundesliga match against Mainz 05 on 27 November 2012 meanwhile playing for Eintracht Frankfurt on loan from Brugge.

In the beginning of 2013, he was loaned to Gaziantepspor having made only two short appearances for Eintracht. After spending two seasons in Turkey, he returned to the Belgian Pro League for Lierse on 16 June 2014, signing a two-year deal.

On 9 January 2016, Kouemaha signed with Iranian club Foolad.

References

External links
 
 
 

1983 births
Living people
Cameroonian footballers
Cameroon international footballers
Association football forwards
Aris Thessaloniki F.C. players
Debreceni VSC players
MSV Duisburg players
Club Brugge KV players
1. FC Kaiserslautern players
Eintracht Frankfurt players
Gaziantepspor footballers
Adana Demirspor footballers
Lierse S.K. players
Denizlispor footballers
Foolad FC players
Belgian Pro League players
Bundesliga players
2. Bundesliga players
Super League Greece players
Süper Lig players
TFF First League players
Cameroonian expatriate footballers
Expatriate footballers in Greece
Expatriate footballers in Hungary
Expatriate footballers in Belgium
Expatriate footballers in Germany
Expatriate footballers in Turkey
Expatriate footballers in Iran